Mikhail Sergeyevich Pavlov (born 1 December 1986) is a Russian sprint canoeist who has competed since the late 2000s. He won a gold medal in the C-1 4 × 200 m relay at the 2010 ICF Canoe Sprint World Championships in Poznań.

References
Men's C-1 4 x 200 m relay A final results. – accessed 22 August 2010.

External links

Living people
Russian male canoeists
1986 births
ICF Canoe Sprint World Championships medalists in Canadian
People from Belaya Kalitva
Universiade medalists in canoeing
Universiade gold medalists for Russia
Medalists at the 2013 Summer Universiade
Sportspeople from Rostov Oblast